Samuel Lilley (25 June 1914, Belfast – 1987) was an educationalist, historian of science and broadcaster active in the United Kingdom following the Second World War.

Sam attended the Belfast Academical Institution followed by Queen's University, Belfast. In 1935 he gained a first class honours degree here in Mathematics and mathematical Physics in 1935. He remained there gaining an M.Sc. in algebraic geometry before moving to St John's College, Cambridge, where he gained a Ph.D. in 1939.

References

Further reading
 

1914 births
1987 deaths
Historians of science
British historians
Alumni of Queen's University Belfast
Alumni of St John's College, Cambridge